Viktor Kalev (born October 20, 1969) is a Bulgarian comedy actor and singer born in Zlatograd. He is well known on television, and he became famous in the TV show Kanaleto, afterwards working in the show Slavi's Show.

See also
 Kanaleto
 Slavi's Show

References

External links
 Viktor Kalev videos on YouTube
 Viktor Kalev videos in SlaviShow
 Victor Kalev - IMDb
 Viktor Kalev - Facebook

1969 births
Living people
Bulgarian male television actors
Bulgarian male stage actors
People from Zlatograd